Sele is a dispersed settlement in the hills east of Kotlje in the Carinthia region in northern Slovenia. A very small part of the settlement lies in the Municipality of Ravne na Koroškem. The major part is in the Municipality of Slovenj Gradec.

References

External links
Sele on Geopedia

Populated places in the Municipality of Ravne na Koroškem